Giant fiber refers to large nerve fibers. The term may refer to:

 Squid giant axon
 Ventral nerve cord in earthworms and arthropods